tvN STORY is a South Korean cable and satellite television channel owned by CJ ENM E&M Division. The channel is targeted to women, originate from OnStyle.

Programs 
 Project Runway Korea (February 7, 2009 – May 18, 2015)
 Korea's Next Top Model (September 18, 2010 – November 1, 2014
 Get It Beauty (season 4-13; July 14, 2010 - 2020)
 Studio GB (September 25, 2020 - April 2021; started May 2021, it moved to Olive.)
 Jessica & Krystal (June 3, 2014 – August 5, 2014)
 The TaeTiSeo (August 26, 2014 – October 21, 2014)
 Hyoyeon's One Million Likes  (June 11, 2015 – August 14, 2015)
 Channel Girls' Generation (July 21, 2015 – September 8, 2015)
 dailyTaeng9Cam (October 24, 2015 – November 21, 2015)
 Channel AOA (March 22, 2016 – May 17, 2016)
 Laundry Day (October 22, 2016 – January 7, 2017)
 Lipstick Prince (December 1, 2016 – June 2, 2017)
 Charm TV
 Hyoyeon's Ten Million Likes (December 19, 2016 – February 6, 2017)
 Seohyun's Home (February 8, 2017 – March 8, 2017)
 Now, Follow Me (September 23, 2022 – present)

Drama 
 My First Time (October 7, 2015 – November 25, 2015)
 Beautiology 101 (Finished)
 Ruby Ruby Love (January 18, 2017 - January 26, 2017 (online)/January 27, 2017 (one-episode drama special))

References

External links 
  

CJ E&M channels
Television channels in South Korea
Korean-language television stations
Television channels and stations established in 2004
Women's interest channels